Galileo Galilei (1564–1642) was a scientist and philosopher. 

Galileo may also refer to:

Aerospace
Galileo (satellite navigation), a global navigation satellite system
Galileo project to send a probe to Jupiter
Galileo (spacecraft), the probe itself
Telescopio Nazionale Galileo, an astronomical telescope
Project Galileo, an educational astronomy resource
Galileo Regio, a feature of Jupiter's moon Ganymede
Galileo Observatory, two NASA atmospheric and ionospheric research planes, also used for airborne astronomy

Companies
Galileo Games, a role-playing games publisher
Galileo Industries, an aerospace company
Galileo Records, a Switzerland-based record label

Computing
Galileo (operating system), an Acorn Computers project
Galileo (supercomputer), a supercomputer in Italy
Galileo GDS, a reservation system
Georgia Library Learning Online (GALILEO), a virtual library
Intel Galileo, a hobby-oriented development board
Galileo, a release of the Eclipse software development environment
Galileo, a codename for version 3.0 of the Windows CE operating system
Galileo, a RCS platform from Hacking Team

Films and television
Galileo (1975 film), an adaptation of Bertolt Brecht's play Life of Galileo
Galileo (1968 film), a biographical film by Liliana Cavani
Galileo (Japanese TV series), a Japanese television drama based on Detective Galileo
Galileo (German TV series), a science program
"Galileo", an episode of The West Wing
Galileo: The Space Awakens, a program broadcast by tvN in South Korea

Music
"Galileo" (song), a 1992 single by the Indigo Girls from Rites of Passage
"Galileo", a single by GG Allin
"Galileo", a song by Amy Grant from Heart in Motion
"Galileo", a song by Mice Parade from Late Night Tales: The Flaming Lips
"Galileo (Someone Like You)", a song by Declan O'Rourke, covered by other artists
"Galileo", a song by Puscifer from Money Shot

Schools
Galileo University, Guatemala
Galileo Academy of Science and Technology, formerly Galileo High School, a school in California
Galileo Magnet High School, Virginia

Other uses
Galileo (horse), an Irish Thoroughbred racehorse
Galileo (magazine), a science fiction magazine
Galileo (planet), an exoplanet also known as 55 Cancri b
Gallileo (skyscraper), a high-rise building in Frankfurt
Galileo (Star Trek), a fictional spacecraft on Star Trek
Galileo (unit), a unit of measurement
Galileo (vibration training)
Camp Galileo, California
Galileo thermometer
Galileo, a rocket in Rocket Ship Galileo
Galileo, a yacht by Aegean Yacht
Galileo, a character from Power Players

People with the given name
 Galileo Chini (1873–1956), Italian decorator, designer, painter, and potter
 Galileo Ferraris (1847–1897), Italian physicist and electrical engineer

See also
Galileo Galilei (disambiguation)
Galilean (disambiguation)
Galileu, a science magazine
Life of Galileo, a 1940 play by Bertolt Brecht
"My Galileo", a song by Belarus in the Eurovision Song Contest